Chris Lonsdale is a psychologist, linguist and educator. His adopted Chinese name, Dragon Tiger, is 龙飞虎 (Traditional Chinese: 龍飛虎; pinyin: lóng fēi hǔ). Lonsdale created the Kung fu English learning system and is also the author of The Third Ear.

Lonsdale graduated from the University of Canterbury in 1980 with first-class honors. He was accepted to Harvard University to do a PhD in hypnosis, however he ultimately decided to explore China as it began opening to the world.

After graduation, he moved to China.

While in Sichuan he translated the book 少林寺民间故事 (Tales of the Shaolin Monastery).

In 1984, Lonsdale moved to Hong Kong, where he learned Cantonese. He authored a book, The Third Ear.

Early life

Childhood and family 
Lonsdale was born in New Zealand.

Career

Chris Lonsdale & Associates LTD. 

Based out of Hong Kong, and operating in the Asia Pacific and Mainland China, Lonsdales’ practice is focused on catalyzing breakthrough performance for leaders and senior teams. He has worked on more than 20 projects that have led to breakthrough results for his clients, including Coca-Cola's Olympics Project for the Beijing 2008 Olympics.

Kung Fu English 
In 2010, Lonsdales created the Kung Fu English learning system.

References

External links 
  (20 Nov 2013)
 
 Dragon Tiger (Chris Lonsdale) on Sina Weibo
  (Cantonese Chinese)

21st-century New Zealand businesspeople
21st-century New Zealand educators
21st-century New Zealand linguists
21st-century New Zealand male writers
21st-century New Zealand non-fiction writers
21st-century New Zealand psychologists
21st-century New Zealand translators
Beijing Language and Culture University alumni
Businesspeople from Christchurch
Chinese–English translators
Educators from Christchurch
Living people
New Zealand expatriates in China
New Zealand expatriates in Hong Kong
New Zealand male judoka
New Zealand male taekwondo practitioners
University of Canterbury alumni
Writers from Christchurch
1963 births